Jia Yubing (born 1983-02-18 in Beijing) is a Chinese baseball player. He was a member of Team China at the 2008 Summer Olympics.

In 2007 he signed with the Seattle Mariners.

Sports career
1992 Beijing Railway No.11 Primary School (Baseball);
1998 Beijing Municipal Baseball Team;
2002 National Team

Major performances
1999 National Championship - 1st;
2001 World Youth Championship - 8th;
2005 National Games - 2nd;
2007 Asian Club Champions Tournament - 4th;
2006-2007 National League - 1st

References
Profile 2008 Olympics Team China

1983 births
Living people
Baseball players at the 2008 Summer Olympics
Chinese baseball players
Olympic baseball players of China
Baseball players from Beijing
Baseball players at the 2002 Asian Games
2013 World Baseball Classic players
Chinese expatriate baseball players in the United States
Asian Games competitors for China
Seattle Mariners players